Red Rose is the fifth and final single from Alphaville's 1986 album, Afternoons in Utopia. It was released in April 1987, and is their ninth single overall.

Reviews
Reviews for the song at the time were generally positive, with one reviewer calling this song "a reasonably sassy pop number that's one of various chances for [singer and songwriter Marian] Gold to exercise his Bryan Ferry fascination." Coincidentally, Alphaville would later cover the Bryan Ferry / Roxy Music song "Do the Strand" on their 2003 release, CrazyShow. Another reviewer stated that "Red Rose", alongside their other notable singles such as "Big in Japan" and "Jerusalem", "reside in the upper echelon of early-'80s synth pop".

Track listings
 7" single
 "Red Rose (7" Version)" — 4:24
 "Concrete Soundtracks For Imaginary Films 1: Big Yellow Sun" — 6:45

 12" German single
 "Red Rose (12" Version)" — 7:53
 "Concrete Soundtracks For Imaginary Films 1: Big Yellow Sun" — 6:45
 "Red Rose (Dub Mix)" — 5:06

 The B-side is referred to by alternate names including "Concrete Soundtraxx For Imaginary Films" and "Big Yello Sun." A remix appears on 1999's album Dreamscapes, and alternate demo appears on the fan-only History release

 12" US single
 "Red Rose (12" Version)" — 7:53
 "Next Generation" — 3:58
 "Red Rose (Dub Mix)" — 5:06

 As the previous two singles were not released in the US, that market received the B-side from the "Universal Daddy" single instead
 A remix of the US B-side appears on 1999's album Dreamscapes
 The writing credit for "Next Generation" is listed as "Gold/Lloyd/Echolette/Ryan"
 The original 12" version and the b-side "Concrete Soundtraxx for Imaginary Films 1" both appear in 2014's so80s presents Alphaville

Charts
This song reached #24 on the US Hot Dance Chart in 1987.

Other releases
 Alphaville Amiga Compilation, 1988 (LP version)
 Alphaville: The Singles Collection, 1988 (LP and 12" versions)
 First Harvest 1984-92, 1992 (7" version)
 Dreamscapes, 1999 (demo version)
 Forever Pop, 2001 (new remix)

References

Alphaville (band) songs
1987 singles
Songs written by Marian Gold
Songs written by Bernhard Lloyd
Songs written by Ricky Echolette
Atlantic Records singles
Warner Music Group singles